Paarfieber is a German online dating service.

Overview
Launched in February 2006, the website was created by Michael Hacheneier and owned by Singles United Media.

With over 3 million active users, it ranked 18th of all German social networks in March 2013.

References

External links
Official Website
Chatrooms Site
Detailed Review

Internet properties established in 2001
Online dating services of Germany